Michelle Maldonado is an American politician who serves in the Virginia House of Delegates from the 50th district as a member of the Democratic Party.

Early life and education

Michelle Maldonado was born in Falmouth, Massachusetts. Her grandmother was the first black person to work as a principal in Cape Cod, Massachusetts. She graduated with an undergraduate degree from Barnard College in Latin American studies and Spanish literature and language. She moved to Virginia in 1993, to attended George Washington University Law School. She married Roberto Maldonado Jr., with whom she had one son. She was admitted to the bar in Washington, D.C., and Virginia.

Virginia House of Delegates

Maldonado filed to run for a seat in the Virginia House of Delegates from the 50th district during the 2021 election. She stated that she was inspired to run for office following the murders of Ahmaud Arbery and George Floyd, the killing of Breonna Taylor, and the attack on the United States Capitol. She defeated incumbent Delegate Lee J. Carter, who was also running for the Democratic nomination for governor, and activist Helen Zurita in the Democratic primary. After losing the primary Carter stated on Twitter that "This job has made me miserable for the last 4 years. I made a lot of people's lives objectively better, but the constant assassination threats and harassment were terrible for my family and my health. I'm relieved to say that I've done my part, and now it's someone else's turn." During the primary campaign Carter had raised around $84,000, Maldonado raised around $56,000, and Zurita raised around $6,000. She defeated Republican nominee Steve Pleickhardt in the general election.

Political positions

Maldonado supports increasing the minimum wage to $15 per hour stating that "no person should be working 40 hours a week and still be at, below or close to the poverty line". She declined an endorsement from the NARAL Pro-Choice America during the 2021 election due to their support for the defunding of police.

Electoral history

References

Barnard College alumni
George Washington University Law School alumni
Living people
Democratic Party members of the Virginia House of Delegates
Virginia lawyers
Year of birth missing (living people)